The Clay Wade Bailey Bridge is a cantilever bridge carrying U.S. Route 42 and U.S. Route 127 across the Ohio River, connecting Cincinnati, Ohio and Covington, Kentucky. This also marks the termination of U.S. Route 25. It is a 3-lane bridge; Two lanes are dedicated to travel each way and the middle lane is a reversible lane, meaning the direction of travel of the middle lane changes according to the time of day.

The bridge was named after a prominent political reporter for The Kentucky Post, Clay Wade Bailey; it is not a bailey bridge.

See also
 
 
 
 
 
 List of crossings of the Ohio River

References

External links
 Clay Wade Bailey Bridge at Bridges & Tunnels
 C&O Bridge and Clay Wade Bailey Bridge at Cincinnati-Transit.net

Bridges in Cincinnati
Bridges completed in 1974
Bridges over the Ohio River
U.S. Route 25
U.S. Route 42
Road bridges in Kentucky
Road bridges in Ohio
U.S. Route 127
Bridges of the United States Numbered Highway System
Roads with a reversible lane
Cantilever bridges in the United States